Ogiri is a flavoring made of fermented oil seeds, such as sesame seeds or egusi seeds. The process and product are similar to iru or douchi. Its smell is like cheese, miso, or stinky tofu.

Ogiri is best known in West Africa. It is popular among the Yoruba and Igbo people of Nigeria.

Ogiri made in the traditional West African way only contains: sesame seeds, salt, and water

References

Fermented foods
African cuisine